Henry Chadwick is the name of:
Henry Chadwick (writer) (1824–1908), early baseball writer
Henry Chadwick (theologian) (1920–2008), British academic and Church of England clergyman
Henry Chadwick (journalist) (1866–1934), editor of Seattle weekly newspaper The Argus
Henry Chadwick (EastEnders), fictional character from BBC TV soap opera EastEnders

See also
Henry Chadwick Scholfield (1866–1935), Canadian politician, for St. George
Henry Chadwick Award for baseball researchers